Miloš Novák (5 June 1952 – 26 February 2021) was a Czech ice hockey player who played at the forward position.

Playing career
For the majority of his career, Novák played for HC Dukla Jihlava of the Czechoslovak Extraliga, with whom he won 4 championships. He represented Czechoslovakia at the 1971 IIHF European U19 Championship, where the team won the bronze medal. In the final year of his career, he played for SKLH Žďár nad Sázavou.

For the 1977–78 WHA season, he played 7 games for the Czechoslovakia All-Stars in the World Hockey Association. He recorded 2 assists and 6 penalty minutes.

Biography
Miloš Novák died on 26 February 2021 at the age of 68.

References

External links
 
 

1952 births
2021 deaths
Czech ice hockey forwards
HC Dukla Jihlava players
Czechoslovak ice hockey forwards
Czechoslovakia (WHA) players
Sportspeople from Jihlava